Alice Parkin Massey (1 July 1879 – 29 July 1950) was a Canadian philanthropist and the wife of Vincent Massey, who became Governor General of Canada shortly after Alice Massey's death.

Born in Fredericton, New Brunswick, she was the daughter of George and Annie Parkin. She was educated in Canada, England and Switzerland. In 1914, she was appointed head of the women's students hostel at the University of Toronto. She married Vincent Massey the following year.

During Vincent Massey's term as High Commissioner for Canada in the United Kingdom, Alice became involved in organizations to assist Canadian service personnel in England during World War II, including a medical hospice for injured Canadian servicemen, the Canadian Officers' Club and the Montreal-based Beaver Club. Alice Massey also served as a member of the St. John Ambulance Brigade through World War II and would maintain her connection with St. John Ambulance until her death.

Alice and Vincent Massey had two children, Lionel (1916-1965) and Hart (1918-1996). Due to Alice's death, Lionel Massey's wife Lilias served as chatelaine of Rideau Hall.

Massey died in Port Hope, Ontario on 29 July 1950, aged 71.

References

External links
 
 Massey family fonds at Library and Archives Canada

1879 births
1950 deaths
Alice Massey
Canadian expatriates in England
Canadian philanthropists
Canadian socialites
People from Fredericton
Canadian women philanthropists